Nanopsocetae is one of two major divisions of Troctomorpha in the order Psocodea (formerly Psocoptera), alongside Amphientometae. There are more than 20 families and 5,200 described species in Nanopsocetae.

Taxonomy
The clade contains four major groups, Phthiraptera (lice), Liposcelididae, Pachytroctidae and Sphaeropsocidae.

References

Further reading

 

 
Troctomorpha